Low Level Owl: Volume II is the fourth studio album by the Appleseed Cast, released two months after Low Level Owl: Volume I.

The albums met with a considerable degree of acclaim, and the band found themselves saddled with the term "America's closest answer to Radiohead".

Track listing
"View of a Burning City" – 1:27
"Strings" – 5:09
"A Place in Line" – 4:01
"Shaking Hands" – 1:59
"Rooms and Gardens" – 7:34
"Ring Out the Warning Bell" – 5:59
"Sunset Drama King" – 6:07
"The Last in a Line" – 4:13
"Decline" – 1:03
"The Argument" – 5:51
"Reaction" – 2:26
"Confession" – 9:21

References

External links
Low Level Owl Volume II at Deep Elm Records

2001 albums
The Appleseed Cast albums
Albums produced by Ed Rose
Deep Elm Records albums